The Salto del Lobo ("Wolf's Leap") or Peregil was a point on the North Face of the Rock of Gibraltar overlooking Spanish territory and the Neutral Ground between Gibraltar and Spain.

References

Bibliography

 

Landforms of Gibraltar
Headlands of Europe